Theretra kuehni is a moth of the  family Sphingidae. It is known from Indonesia.

It is very similar to Theretra insignis but smaller and the forewings are less pointed. The forewing upperside is as in Theretra insignis, but the silvery-white band between the third and fifth postmedian lines is more strongly curved.

References

Theretra
Moths described in 1900